Gentner Frederick Drummond (born October 3, 1963) is an American attorney, rancher, banker, and politician from Oklahoma. Drummond is a member of the Republican Party and the current Attorney General of Oklahoma. He flew in the Gulf War air campaign during the Persian Gulf War, gaining national coverage for being one of the first American pilots interviewed during the war. He resides in the McBirney Mansion and is a member of the Oklahoma Drummond ranching family.

Early life, education, and military career
Gentner Frederick Drummond was born to Leslie and Carol Ann Drummond. He is named after his great-great-grandmother, Gentner.
He is part of the  fifth-generation of Oklahoma's Drummond banking and ranching family; Scottish immigrants who leased land in Osage County from the Osage Nation beginning in the 1880s and acquired Osage headrights during the Osage County Reign of Terror (the family reportedly enriched itself by exploiting a legal regime for trusteeship that rendered Osage adults effectively second class citizens and by allegedly charging members of the Osage tribe a higher "Osage price" for goods and services). By 2017, the Drummond family ranked as the 23rd-largest landowning family in the United States. Drummond bought his first piece of land at age 14 and later graduated valedictorian from Hominy High School in Hominy, Oklahoma in 1981. He then attended Oklahoma State University–Stillwater, was a member of the Air Force ROTC, and received a bachelor's degree in agriculture economics in December 1984.

Drummond enlisted in the United States Air Force in March 1985, served for eight years, reached the rank of captain, and flew F-15C Eagles. During the Gulf War, he took part in the first combat mission of Operation Desert Storm on January 17, 1991, and was one of the first three pilots interviewed by pool reporters after the mission. He earned a Distinguished Flying Cross for "superb situational awareness, airmanship and understanding of the established rules of engagement", three Air Medals, and four Aerial Achievement Medals during his service. Drummond completed 32 missions with 190 hours of flight time during the conflict.

After his military service, Drummond then worked as a staffer for U.S. Senator David Boren, the last Democratic senator from Oklahoma, between 1993 and 1994. He then earned a Juris Doctor in the night program at Georgetown University Law Center.

Business and legal career
After returning to Oklahoma in the early 1990's, Drummond worked for Boone, Smith, Davis, Hurst and Dickman law firm in Tulsa, Oklahoma, as well as serving as an assistant district attorney for Pawnee and Osage Counties. Drummond later founded Drummond Law, a law firm focused on banking law with his second wife Wendy Drummond. His legal tactics when representing family have been criticised by Oklahoma media outlets.  Drummond is also a principal owner of Blue Sky Bank (formerly Citizens Bank of Oklahoma, NBC Bank, and the National Bank of Commerce), as well as Drummond Communications, a store agency for U.S. Cellular under the trade name Premier Locations. He also owns the  event location Post Oak Lodge. He also operates a  ranch near Pawhuska, Oklahoma.

Drummond's legal representation of family members would attract controversy. In 2012, the Bigheart Times (the largest newspaper in Osage County) reported that Drummond, who was representing a member of the Drummond family in a criminal proceeding, called a reporter from that publication as a witness in a case she did not witness and had no personal connection to in order to prevent her from being able to report on the matter (she was dismissed as a witness by the court), raising comment from the state's oldest public transparency group.  In 2013, Drummond’s client (his first cousin Jana Drummond Evans) testified under oath that Drummond encouraged his client to lie to the court about her county of residency for strategic advantage in a divorce case (however, during his 2018 campaign, Drummond maintained reporting on the testimony was politically motivated).  In 2015, Special Judge Lisa Hammond wrote in the divorce decree that Evans had done so "to support her efforts to establish venue in a county where she apparently believed the Drummond family name would provide her an advantage."

In 2019, the United States federal government sued Drummond, two of his businesses (Drummond Ranch LLC and Drummond Cattle LLC), and Regier Flying Service (which he had engaged) for allegedly spreading herbicide that killed more than 40,000 trees on United States Army Corps of Engineers land near Skiatook Lake and Birch Lake. However, the case was later settled and dismissed without prejudice after Regier Flying Service agreed to pay a $240,000 settlement. Drummond defended spraying the herbicide saying the federal government's position was "contrary to wildlife management and natural range development" and the public lands in question had been "formerly ours."

During the COVID-19 pandemic, Drummond's cattle ranch, US Cellular stores, and law firm received $3.6 million in Paycheck Protection Program funds over the course of two years; in the second year, the three businesses applied for and were approved for their loans from Blue Sky Bank, a bank which is also owned by Drummond.

Political aspirations
In a 2013 interview before running for office, Drummond described his politics as aligning with the "business class ... which translates to mean that there is a little Republican and a little Democrat in everyone" and noted the importance of the Democratic Party in helping Oklahoma in the 1920s and 1930s, and he also noted the prosperity brought by the Republican Party in the 1980s and 1990s.

2018 Attorney General campaign

Drummond ran for attorney general of Oklahoma as a Republican in the 2018 election. Michael J. Hunter led the first round with 44.5 percent of the vote while Drummond finished in second with 38.5 percent, with both advancing to a runoff election. 
Hunter defeated Drummond in the runoff by 271 votes. 
Drummond campaigned as a reform-oriented political outsider with more experience, maintaining that Hunter had never tried a case. 
Drummond attacked Hunter as a "career lobbyist" who was overly reliant on outside counsel and challenged Hunter's residency in Oklahoma, while Hunter characterized Drummond as dishonest and unethical. During the race, controversies from Drummond's legal career provided fodder for news coverage.

Oklahoma Senator James Lankford, Congressman Tom Cole, and Oklahoma City Mayor David Holt criticized Drummond's campaign for an ad claiming that Hunter supported jobs for undocumented immigrants and that such support led to the murder of Mollie Tibbetts. Tibbetts's family denounced the campaign ad as racist and an attempt to politicize the murder.

Attorney General of Oklahoma

2022 Attorney General campaign

Drummond ran for attorney general again in the 2022 election, despite speculation he may instead run for Oklahoma's open senate seat. In the primary, Drummond faced incumbent John M. O'Connor and at the outset Drummond announced he would be willing to spend another $2,000,000 of his own money to support his second bid. He campaigned as a candidate independent of Governor Kevin Stitt, who had appointed O'Connor after Michael J. Hunter's resignation. The aftermath of McGirt v. Oklahoma was a dominant issue in the campaign: both candidates criticized the ruling, but O'Connor argued that litigation to overturn or winnow the ruling in McGirt was warranted, whereas Drummond championed a less litigious approach (the candidates also differed in their opinions on  whether Congress should disestablish certain reservations at issue, with Drummond opposing such action). During the June 16 Republican primary debate, O'Connor called Drummond a "Democrat in Republican clothing." O'Connor ran ads attacking Drummond for a donation of $1,000 by Drummond to the Joe Biden Presidential campaign in 2020 as well as Drummond's history of giving to Democratic candidates. Drummond claimed that the donation to Biden's campaign was made by his wife and provided receipts showing the donation was later refunded. The Tulsa World reported that Drummond's last donation to a non-Republican candidate for federal office was to Matt Silverstein's 2014 United States Senate campaign. In the final month of the primary, Drummond's campaign benefited from over $1 million in dark money spending on ads opposing O'Connor's candidacy in the final month of the race. During the primary campaign, Drummond met with Osage Nation Chief Geoffrey Standing Bear and Standing Bear offered to support his candidacy if he promised to never bring a case affecting the Osage Mineral estate. Drummond refused and his campaign was not supported by the Osage Nation.

Drummond defeated O'Connor in a close Republican primary election, winning 180,338 votes compared to O’Connor’s 174,125 (less than 1.8% of votes cast). As no Democrats filed to run for attorney general, Drummond faced Libertarian Lynda Steele in the November general election.

Tenure
In January 2023, Drummond announced one of his early priorities in office would be to investigate the misuse of COVID-19 relief funds. That month, the attorney general's office took over the Swadley's Bar-B-Q investigation, the prosecution of the founders of Epic Charter Schools, and an investigation into the Oklahoma Commissioners of the Land Office. 
He attended the execution of Scott Eizember on January 12, and afterward he announced a slowdown to Oklahoma's execution schedule citing the stress the scheduled caused on Oklahoma Department of Corrections staff. On the last day of January, his office dismissed the case against Classwallet filed by former attorney general John M. O'Connor for mishandling parts of a $31 million federal education grant.

The next month his office took control of the corruption case against Terry O'Donnell from the newly elected Oklahoma County district attorney Vicki Behenna's office.

Personal life
Drummond has four children and two stepchildren with Catherine Drummond. In 2014, Drummond and his wife, Wendy Drummond, bought the McBirney Mansion for $2.03 million to be their personal residence. Reality television star and entrepreneur Ree Drummond is the wife of Drummond's second cousin. Drummond has an interest in fashion that he credits to his wife.

Drummond is an Eagle Scout. He received a 2018 Outstanding Eagle Scout Award. In 2022, Drummond was inducted into the Osage County Historical Society's list of "Heroes and Legends."

In March 2022, Drummond's son, Oklahoma Air National Guard Major Alexander Drummond, survived the crash of an F-16 he was piloting in Beauregard Parish, Louisiana during a routine training mission out of Ellington Field Joint Reserve Base in Texas after ejecting from the plane.

Electoral history

2018

2022

References

External links

1963 births
Candidates in the 2018 United States elections
Georgetown University Law Center alumni
Living people
Military personnel from Oklahoma
Oklahoma Attorneys General
Gentner Drummond
Oklahoma Republicans
Oklahoma State University alumni
People from Hominy, Oklahoma
United States Air Force officers
United States Air Force personnel of the Gulf War